Zohan (also Romanized as Zohān; also known as Zihūn) is a city in and the capital of Zohan District, in Zirkuh County, South Khorasan Province, Iran. At the 2006 census, its population was 707, in 233 families.

References 

Populated places in Zirkuh County

Cities in South Khorasan Province